BER Airport – Terminal 1-2 station
BER Airport – Terminal 5 station, formerly Berlin-Schönefeld Airport station